The Russian Social Democratic Labour Party (RSDLP; in , Rossiyskaya sotsial-demokraticheskaya rabochaya partiya (RSDRP)), also known as the Russian Social Democratic Workers' Party or the Russian Social Democratic Party, was a socialist political party founded in 1898 in Minsk (then in Northwestern Krai of the Russian Empire, present-day Belarus).

Formed to unite the various revolutionary organizations of the Russian Empire into one party, the RSDLP split in 1903 into Bolsheviks ("majority") and Mensheviks ("minority") factions, with the Bolshevik faction eventually becoming the Communist Party of the Soviet Union.

History

Origins and early activities 
The RSDLP was not the first Russian Marxist group; the Emancipation of Labour group had been formed in 1883. The RSDLP was created to oppose the revolutionary populism of the Narodniks, which was later represented by the Socialist Revolutionary Party (SRs). The RSLDP was formed at an underground conference in Minsk in March 1898. There were nine delegates: from the Jewish Labour Bund, and from the Robochaya Gazeta ("Workers' Newspaper") in Kiev, both formed a year earlier in 1897; and the League of Struggle for the Emancipation of the Working Class in Saint Petersburg. Some additional social democrats from Moscow and Yekaterinburg also attended. The RSDLP program was based strictly on the theories of Karl Marx and Friedrich Engels. Specifically, that despite Russia's agrarian nature at the time, the true revolutionary potential lay with the industrial working class.  At this time, there were three million Russian industrial workers, just 3% of the population. The RSDLP was illegal for most of its existence. Within a month after the Congress, five of the nine delegates were arrested by the Okhrana (imperial secret police).

Before the 2nd Party Congress in 1903, a young intellectual named Vladimir Ilyich Ulyanov (better known by his pseudonym, Vladimir Lenin) joined the party. In 1902, he had published What Is To Be Done?, outlining his view of the party's proper task and methodology: to form "the vanguard of the proletariat". He advocated a disciplined, centralized party of committed activists who would fuse the underground struggle for political freedom with the class struggle of the proletariat.

Internal divisions 
In 1903, the 2nd Party Congress met in exile in Brussels to attempt to create a united force. However, after unprecedented attention from the Belgian authorities the Congress moved to London, meeting on 11 August in a chapel in Tottenham Court Road. At the Congress, the party split into two irreconcilable factions on 17 November: the Bolsheviks (derived from bolshinstvo—Russian for "majority"), headed by Lenin; and the Mensheviks (from menshinstvo—Russian for "minority"), headed by Julius Martov. Confusingly, the Mensheviks were actually the larger faction, but the names Menshevik and Bolshevik were taken from a vote held at the 1903 Party Congress for the editorial board of the party newspaper, Iskra (Spark), with the Bolsheviks being the majority and the Mensheviks being the minority. These were the names used by the factions for the rest of the party Congress and these are the names retained after the split at the 1903 Congress. Lenin's faction later ended up in the minority and remained smaller than the Mensheviks until the Russian Revolution.

A central issue at the Congress was the question of the definition of party membership. Martov proposed the following formulation: "A member of the Russian Social Democratic Labour Party is one who accepts the Party's programme, supports the Party financially, and renders it regular personal assistance under the direction of one of its organizations". On the other hand, Lenin proposed a more strict definition: "A member of the Russian Social-Democratic Labour Party is one who accepts its programme and who supports the Party both financially and by personal participation in one of the Party organizations". Martov's big tent definition of party membership initially won the vote 28-23. However, his majority was short-lived, given the exit from the party, for separate reasons, of its Bundist and Economist members who had supported his definition. That left in the majority those in favour of Lenin's definition of party members as, in effect, professional revolutionaries- centrally directed, tightly disciplined, and therefore capable of operating effectively in the tsarist police state. From this was derived the faction names: "Majority" ("Bolshevik") and "Minority" ("Menshevik").

Despite a number of attempts at reunification, the split proved permanent. As time passed, ideological differences emerged in addition to the original organizational differences. The main difference that emerged in the years after 1903 was that the Bolsheviks believed that only the workers, backed up by the peasantry, could carry out the bourgeois-democratic revolutionary tasks in Russia, which would then provide incentive to socialist revolution in Germany, France and Britain, while the Mensheviks believed that the workers and peasants must seek out enlightened people from the liberal bourgeoisie to carry out the bourgeois-democratic revolutionary tasks in Russia. The two warring factions both agreed that the coming revolution would be "bourgeois-democratic" within Russia, but while the Mensheviks viewed the liberals as the main ally in this task, the Bolsheviks opted for an alliance with the peasantry as the only way to carry out the bourgeois-democratic revolutionary tasks while defending the interests of the working class. Essentially, the difference was that the Bolsheviks considered that in Russia the tasks of the bourgeois democratic revolution would have to be carried out without the participation of the bourgeoisie. The 3rd Party Congress was held separately by the Bolsheviks.

The 4th Party Congress was held in Stockholm, Sweden and saw a formal reunification of the two factions (with the Mensheviks in the majority), but the discrepancies between Bolshevik and Menshevik views became particularly clear during the proceedings.

The 5th Party Congress was held in London, England, in 1907. It consolidated the supremacy of the Bolshevik faction and debated strategy for communist revolution in Russia. Joseph Stalin never later referred to his stay in London.

1912 split 
The Social Democrats (SDs) boycotted elections to the First Duma (April–July 1906), but they were represented in the Second Duma (February–June 1907). With the SRs, they held 83 seats. The Second Duma was dissolved on the pretext of the discovery of an SD conspiracy to subvert the army. Under new electoral laws, the SD presence in the Third Duma (1907–1912) was reduced to 19. From the Fourth Duma (1912–1917), the SDs were finally and fully split. The Mensheviks had seven members in the Duma and the Bolsheviks had six, including Roman Malinovsky, who was later uncovered as an Okhrana agent.

In the years of Tsarist repression that followed the defeat of the 1905 Russian Revolution, both the Bolshevik and Menshevik factions faced splits, causing further splits in the RSDLP, which manifested themselves from late 1908 and the years immediately following. The Mensheviks split into the "Pro-Party Mensheviks" led by Georgi Plekhanov, who wished to maintain illegal underground work as well as legal work; and the "Liquidators", whose most prominent advocates were Pavel Axelrod, Fyodor Dan, Nikolai Aleksandrovich Rozhkov and Nikolay Chkheidze, who wished to pursue purely legal activities and who now repudiated illegal and underground work.

The Bolsheviks split threeways into the Proletary group led by Lenin, Grigory Zinoviev and Lev Kamenev, who waged a fierce struggle against the liquidators, ultimatists and recallists; the Ultimatist group led by Grigory Aleksinsky, who wished to issue ultimatums to the RSDLP Duma deputies to follow the party line or to resign immediately; and the Recallist group led by Alexander Bogdanov and Anatoly Lunacharsky and supported by Maxim Gorky, who called for the immediate recall of all RSDLP Duma deputies and a boycott of all legal work by the RSDLP, in favour of increased radical underground and illegal work.

There was also a non-faction group led by Leon Trotsky, who denounced all the "factionalism" in the RSDLP, pushed for "unity" in the party and focused more strongly on the problems of Russian workers and peasants on the ground. The Menshevik Julius Martov was formally considered a liquidator partly because most of his closest political friends were liquidators.

In January 1912, Lenin's Proletary Bolshevik group called a conference in Prague and expelled the liquidators, ultimatists and recallists from the RSDLP, which officially led to the creation of a separate party, known as the Russian Social Democratic Labour Party (Bolsheviks), while the Mensheviks continued their activities establishing the Russian Social Democratic Labour Party (Mensheviks). In August 1912, Trotsky's group tried to reunite all the RSDLP factions into the same party at a conference in Vienna, but he was largely rebuffed by the Bolsheviks. The Bolsheviks seized power during the October Revolution in 1917 when all political power was transferred to the soviets and in 1918 changed their name to the All-Russian Communist Party. They banned the Mensheviks after the Kronstadt rebellion of 1921.

The  Interdistrictites, known as the Russian Social Democratic Labor Party (Internationalists), emerged in 1913 as another faction emerging from the RSDLP.

Party branches

Estonia
In 1902, the Tallinn organization of the RSDLP was founded, which in 1904 was converted into the Tallinn Committee of the party. In November, a parallel (that is, also directly under the CC of RSDLP) Narva Committee was created. Amongst other radicals, the Estonian RSDLP cadres were active in the 1905 Revolution. At the conference of the Estonian RSDLP organizations in Terijoki, Finland in March 1907, the Bolshevik supporters came into serious conflict with the Mensheviks.

Livonia
At the 4th (Unity) Congress of the RSDLP in 1906, the Latvian Social Democratic Workers Party entered the RSDLP as a territorial organisation. After the Congress, its name was changed Social-Democracy of the Latvian Territory.

Congresses

Electoral history

Legislative elections

See also 
 
 Factions of the Russian Social Democratic Labour Party
 Socialist Revolutionary Party
 Zreniye

Notes

Footnotes

 
1898 establishments in the Russian Empire
1918 disestablishments in Russia
Mensheviks
Old Bolsheviks
Political parties disestablished in 1918
Political parties established in 1898
Organizations of the 1905 Russian Revolution